Nguyễn Thị Tuyết Dung (born 13 December 1993) is a Vietnamese footballer who plays as a midfielder. She won the Vietnamese Golden Ball award for women's soccer player in 2014. In a 2015 match against Malaysia, Dung scored two goals directly from corners. The first goal was scored with her left foot, and the second with her right foot. In 2017, Dung was named on the BBC 100 Women list. Dung was the first Vietnamese athlete on the BBC 100 Women list.

Individual
Vietnamese Women's Golden Ball: 2014, 2018
Vietnamese Women's Silver Ball: 2015, 2017
Vietnamese Women's Bronze Ball: 2019

Medal
 Labor Order 2nd Class: 2022

International goals
Scores and results are list Vietnam's goal tally first.

References

External links 
 

1993 births
Living people
Women's association football midfielders
Vietnamese women's footballers
People from Hà Nam Province
Vietnam women's international footballers
Asian Games competitors for Vietnam
Footballers at the 2014 Asian Games
Footballers at the 2018 Asian Games
Southeast Asian Games gold medalists for Vietnam
Southeast Asian Games medalists in football
Competitors at the 2017 Southeast Asian Games
Competitors at the 2019 Southeast Asian Games
Southeast Asian Games silver medalists for Vietnam
Competitors at the 2013 Southeast Asian Games
BBC 100 Women
21st-century Vietnamese women